The SFO–Millbrae line (also known as the SFO–Millbrae shuttle) was a Bay Area Rapid Transit (BART) shuttle line in the San Francisco Bay Area that ran between Millbrae station and San Francisco International Airport station (SFO). The line was colored purple on maps, and BART sometimes called it the Purple Line. The line was a shuttle service with no intermediate stops; it shared tracks with two of the five other mainline BART services. The service operated from June 2003 to February 2004 and from February 2019 to August 2021.

Service history

2003–2004 service

When the BART-SFO Extension opened on June 22, 2003, the Pittsburg/Bay Point line (Yellow Line) was extended to Millbrae station, while the Dublin/Pleasanton line (Blue Line) was extended to San Francisco International Airport station. Service between the SFO and Millbrae terminals was provided by this line, which operated every 20 minutes. The line was discontinued on February 9, 2004 during the first of several service changes on the extension.

For the next several years, direct service between SFO and Millbrae was provided by other BART lines. Between February 2004 and September 2005, the Richmond line (Red Line) connected the stations on weekdays and Pittsburg/Bay Point line (Yellow Line) connected the stations on nights and weekends. Between September 2005 and January 2008, the Dublin/Pleasanton line (Blue Line) provided the connection at all times.

On January 1, 2008, direct service between Millbrae and the airport was discontinued and passengers connecting between SFO and Millbrae needed to transfer at San Bruno station. Direct service between the stations was restored on September 14, 2009 during nights and weekends as an extension of the Pittsburg/Bay Point line.

2019–2021 service

On June 24, 2018, SamTrans began operating route SFO, a dedicated bus service between the two stations. Unlike BART service, the bus route operates on irregular headways timed to meet certain Caltrain trains at Millbrae.

On February 11, 2019, BART resumed direct SFO–Millbrae service at all times. On weekdays until 9 pm and on Sundays, a dedicated shuttle train operated between the two stations, with timed transfers to Antioch line (Yellow Line) trains at SFO. The Antioch line continued to run between SFO and Millbrae on weeknights and Saturdays. On February 10, 2020, BART began listing the SFO–Millbrae line as operating at all times, with the Antioch line terminating at SFO at all times. The service was operated with a dedicated shuttle train on weekdays and Saturdays, with timed transfers to Antioch line (Yellow Line) trains at SFO. On weeknights and Sundays, the two services were interlined, with no transfer required at SFO.

Beginning on March 22, 2021, the shuttle was interlined with the Richmond line on weekdays, and with the Antioch line on weekends. The shuttle was eliminated effective August 2, 2021; it was replaced by an extension of the Richmond line to SFO on weekdays and Saturdays, and by an extension of the Antioch line to Millbrae evenings and Sundays.

On March 6, 2022, a break in a power cable near Berkeley caused SFO–Richmond service to be temporarily discontinued. On March 8, a shuttle service began operating between SFO and Millbrae. Red Line service resumed on March 22, with the shuttle discontinued. A similar cable break near Richmond on June 17, 2022, resulted in SFO–Millbrae shuttle service being used to supplement limited Red Line service beginning on June 20.

References 

Purple Line (BART)
Railway lines opened in 2003
2003 establishments in California
Railway services discontinued in 2004
2004 disestablishments in California
Railway services introduced in 2019
2019 establishments in California
Railway services discontinued in 2021
2021 disestablishments in California